The Watling Valley Ecumenical Partnership is a Local Ecumenical Partnership (LEP) in Milton Keynes, England which belongs to the Church of England, The Baptist Union, the Methodist Church and the United Reformed Church.
The Watling Valley is a large area on the western side of Milton Keynes. This area is covered by one Anglican Parish.

Locations 
 All Saints, Loughton
 St. Mary's, Shenley
 Holy Cross, Two Mile Ash
 Servant King, Furzton
 St. Giles, Tattenhoe

External links
Official website

Churches in Buckinghamshire
Organisations based in Milton Keynes
Christian ecumenical organizations